Iron & Silk is a 1990 Canadian action comedy-drama based on the eponymous book by American writer Mark Salzman.  It details his journey to China after college to study Chinese wu shu, better known in the west as kung fu, and to teach English.  Though not trained as an actor, Salzman starred as himself, as did Pan Qingfu, who claimed no one else could portray him on film.  Salzman's experiences occurred in Changsha, Hunan, though the film was shot in Hangzhou, Zhejiang. The film was directed by Shirley Sun, and was the editorial debut for Geraldine Peroni.

Plot
Mark Franklin arrives in Hangzhou, China to teach Chinese teachers the English language. He learns the refinements of correct behavior among Chinese people, makes friends with his pupils, falls in love with the young doctor Ming, learns wushu (Chinese martial arts) from the famous teacher Pan... but also learns about political repression, especially when he's forbidden contact with some of his friends.

Cast

Main cast
 Mark Salzman as Mark Franklin
 Vivian Wu as Ming
 Pan Qingfu as himself, a martial arts master
 Jeanette Lin Tsui as Teacher Hei
 Sun Xudong as Sinbad

Others
 To Funglin as Old Sheep
 Hu Yun as Fatty Du
 Dong Hangcheng as Teacher Cai
 Lu Zhiquan as Teacher Li
 Xiao Ying as April
 Yang Xiru as Dr. Wang
 Zhuang Genyuan as Teacher Xu
 Jiang Xihong as Teacher Zhang
 He Saifei as the Yue opera performer who played Madame White Snake
 Xia Saili (He Saifei's sister) as the Yue opera performer who played Xu Xian
 Chen Huiling as the Yue opera performer who played Xiaoqing

Reception
The movie gained mostly positive reviews, ranging from a "modest charmer; a true sleeper" to "unsophisticated [and] bittersweet". The movie was met with some criticism, ranging from "an unhappy teenager's fantasy of finally fitting in" to "we're talking geekarama here".

References

External links

Films based on biographies
American films based on actual events
American martial arts films
Wushu films
1990 drama films
1990 films
American coming-of-age films
American drama films
Films set in Hangzhou
Films shot in China
Columbia Pictures films
1990 martial arts films
1991 drama films
1991 films
Biographical films about writers
1990s English-language films
1990s American films